Cabinet of Petr Nečas was formed after 2010 Czech legislative election. It consisted of Civic Democratic Party, TOP 09 and Public Affairs (later replaced by LIDEM).

Government ministers

References 
Czech parties agree on new government line-up (ČTK)

Czech government cabinets
Civic Democratic Party (Czech Republic)
TOP 09
Mayors and Independents
Public Affairs (political party)
Coalition governments of the Czech Republic